Samuel Shepard Conner ( – December 17, 1820) was a U.S. representative from Massachusetts.

Born in Exeter, New Hampshire, Conner attended Phillips Exeter Academy in 1794. He was graduated from Yale College in 1806. He studied law.

Conner married Elizabeth Denniston of Albany, New York.
He was admitted to the bar and commenced practice in Waterville, Maine (at that time a district of Massachusetts), in 1810.
Conner served in the War of 1812.  Conner was first a major of the Twenty-first Infantry. In the beginning of 1813 Conner served as aide-de-camp to General Henry Dearborn.  He was one of the American officers who accepted the British surrender at the Battle of York.  
He was promoted to lieutenant colonel of the Thirteenth Infantry March 12, 1813.
He resigned July 14, 1814.
He resumed the practice of law in Waterville, Maine.

Conner was elected as a Democratic-Republican to the Fourteenth Congress (March 4, 1815 – March 3, 1817).
He was appointed surveyor general of the Ohio land district in 1819.
He died in Covington, Kentucky, December 17, 1820.

Sources

Notes

1780s births
1820 deaths
Phillips Exeter Academy alumni
Yale College alumni
Massachusetts Democratic-Republicans
People from Waterville, Maine
United States Army officers
Democratic-Republican Party members of the United States House of Representatives from the District of Maine
19th-century American politicians
Members of the United States House of Representatives from Massachusetts